Lao is generally a subject–verb–object language, but emphasis can move the object to the beginning of a sentence. The language lacks both agreement and case marking, but word order is very free, with predicate-argument relations determined largely through context. Lao is a right-branching language, much like other Southeast Asian languages and, to a lesser extent, Romance languages.

Politeness
Since Lao culture is stratified based on the age, occupation, wealth or clout of the speaker, one must afford differing amounts of respect based on the discrepancy between one person and another. That affects language as well; to make language more polite, more formal language, including of pronouns (which can otherwise be dropped) and more formal versions of them, and sentence-ending particles can be used. Also, ending particles also serve to soften and make one's speech more polite.
 ແດ່
In addition to ending most general statements and the softening of imperatives and requests, it is also used to intensify the meaning (especially of adjectives and adverbs) more politely, to make the use of demonstrative pronouns more polite, or to indicate a certain amount or some extent of something.
 ເດີ or ເດີ້ or ເດ
They are used as a more intensive version of ແດ່, thus giving requests and demands more urgency and are used for statements that tend to be more emphatic. They are, therefore, not as polite. ເດ also has the sense of and what about or to indicate an equivalent to this as a demonstrative pronoun.

Nouns
Nouns are not marked for plurality, gender, or declension but may be single or plural. Unlike in English, nouns are not marked with articles. Measure words or classifiers (ລັກສະໜະນາມ) are often used to express plurals, as classifiers must be used to count objects, but the noun itself remains unchanged.

Verbs of physical action are easily converted into nouns by adding ການ (kan ) before the verb. Abstract actions and adjectives use ຄວາມ (khwam ) instead.

Pronouns

Pronouns (ສັບພະນາມ) are often dropped in informal contexts and replaced with nicknames or kinship terms, depending on the relation of the speaker spoken to (sometimes even spoken about). Pronouns can change based on register of speech, including the obsolete royal and the formal, informal and vulgar. In more formal language, pronouns are more often retained and more formal ones used. Pronouns can be pluralized by adding ພວກ in front: ພວກເຈົ້າ for "you plural". Age and status determine usage. Younger children's names are often prefixed with ບັກ and ອີ, respectively. Slightly older children are addressed to or have their names prefixed with ອ້າຍ and ເອື້ອຍ, respectively, but ພີ່ is also common. Much older people may be politely dressed as aunt, uncle, mother, father, or even grandmother or grandfather, depending on their age. In a company setting, one's title is often used.

Demonstrative pronouns

Verbs
Lao verbs (ກະລິຍາ) are not conjugated for tense, mood, or person. Tense is indicated by using time reference words, such as yesterday, next year, just now or by certain particles. Nouns that begin with ການ or ຄວາມ, often nominalised verbs, become verbs again when those particles are dropped.

Copula
Lao has two forms of the verb to be, ເປັນ and ແມ່ນ which are somewhat interchangeable. As a general rule, the latter is not used to describe people.

Tense
In a general, in a short Lao sentence, the verb is often not marked for tense and can be taken from context, with words such as yesterday, tomorrow, later, etc. If the subject of when the events occurred is already known, they can also be left out and inferred from dialogue. However, there are several ways to mark tense in Lao:

Past
The most common way to indicate a completed action is to end a statement with ແລ້ວ. That can also be used to indicate events that occurred in the recent past. One can also use the particle ໄດ້ preceding the verb, alone or in conjunction with ແລ້ວ, although this is less common and often used in negative statements and never for a continuous action.

Future
There are two markers used to indicate actions to be completed in the future, ຊິ  and ຈະ. Both of these always precede the verb. To indicate that something is just about to happen, one can say ກຳລັງຈະ.

Progressive
Although no particle is generally needed to mark a present progressive statement, Lao uses three, ພວມ and ກຳລັງ before the verb, ຢູ່ (yu ) after it.

Modal verbs
Modal or auxiliary verbs (ວິກະຕິກະລິຍາ, vikatikaligna) are verbs that serve auxiliary function, such as want, obligation or need like English ought to, should, must, can, etc.

Obligation
ຄວນ Should, ought to

Need
ຕ້ອງ to need, must.
When the need is a noun, ຕ້ອງການ is used instead.

Want
ຢາກ, to want, to desire
Used to express a want or desire. When this is a noun, then the form ຢາກໄດ້ (yak dai ) or the common verb ເອົາ (ao ) is used instead, but the latter is not as polite.

Can, be able to
ໄດ້ to get, to have, to be able to
That is used to indicate the ability to do something. It is the closest Lao word for the English verb can and in requests when English speakers would use may. When used in that sense, it follows the verb; before the verb, the meaning changes to to get or to have.

ເປັນ to be, to be able to
In addition to being a verb for the copula, it can also be used to indicate that one can do something because of knowing how to do it.

ສາມາດ...ໄດ້ to be able to, to be possible
It functions much like can but with the sense of being physically possible to do.

Enter, join
ເຂົ້າ, to enter, to join, to participate
Used to indicate movement from one place to another inside, such as a house or building.

Recipiency
ໃຫ້,   to give, to permit, to let
Used to indicate that the verb is intended for someone or something else or to express a desire, a wish, or a command.

Affirmation and negation
To say no is as simple as saying ບໍ່, and negation simply involves placing that word in front of the verb, adjective, adverb, or noun to be negated. To say yes, especially to indicate that one is listening, one uses ໂດຍ, especially in formal situations, or ເຈົ້າ. To answer a question, one often repeats the verb of action that was used in the question to indicate that that action was or will be completed. One can also use ແມ່ນ, especially if the question had ແມ່ນ, as an element of the interrogative particle.

Adverbs and adjectives
Little distinction can be made between adjectives and adverbs, as any adjective that could logically be used to modify a verb can also be used as an adverb. They are often duplicated to indicate a superlative and can even be modified like verbs, mainly by the lack of a copula to link the object and adjective/adverb. Adjectives come after the noun.

Equivalence, comparatives, and superlatives
To indicate that something is the same, one uses ຄືກັນ. To indicate that one is similar to something else, one uses ຄືກັບ.

Comparatives take the form "A ກວ່າ B", or A is more than B.  The superlative is expressed by "A ທີ່ສຸດ", or A is the best. All adjectives can be altered in this way:

Questions
Lao uses special tag words at the beginning or the end of the sentence to indicate a question, so the modern use of the question mark (?) is redundant.

Yes-no questions end in ບໍ່, but Lao also has other sentence interrogative finals that indicate whether or not the speaker expects an answer, knows the answer to be expected, will be surprised, or is rhetorically asking a question, but they are generally used only in conversational settings.

Other common interrogatives
Who? ຜູ້ໃດ and its common short form ໃຜ

What? ຈັ່ງໃດ and its common short form ຫຽັງ

Where? ໃສ

When? ເມື່ອໃດ, and many others.
There are numerous ways to ask when something will occur, many of which are formed by adding ໃດ which after a noun marking time, e.g., ເວລາໃດ, ຍາມໃດ, and ປານໃດ.

Why? ເປັນຈັ່ງໃດ
The phrase by itself can also mean What's wrong?, but can also ask why or for what reason a condition is occurring.

How? ແນວໃດ
There are numerous ways to ask how?, some interchangeable with Lao equivalents for what? and why? but in the sense of how something is accomplished or done, one can also use ເຊັ່ນໃດ, ຢ່າງໃດ or ດັ່ງໃດ.

How Much/Many? (General Things) ຈັກ

How Much? (Price) ເທົ່າໃດ or its variant ທໍ່ໃດ

Right? Correct? ແມ່ນບໍ່

Already? Yet? ແລ້ວບໍ່

Or not? ຫຼືບໍ່

Eh? ຫຼື
This is a rather informal interrogative particle equivalent to English eh? or hmm? or huh?.

Answers to questions usually just involve repetition of the verb and any nouns for clarification.
 Question: ສະບາຍດີບໍ່  Are you well?
 Response: ສະບາຍດີ I am well or ບໍ່ສະບາຍ (bo sabai ) I am not well.

Words asked with a negative can be confusing and should be avoided.  The response, even without the negation, will still be negated by the nature of the question.
 ບໍ່ສະບາຍບໍ່  Are you not well?
 Response: ບໍ່ສະບາຍ I am well.

Classifiers
Classifiers (ລັກສະນະນາມ) are used for when referring to a number of things, either a group or a finite amount. Classifiers can be used in place of the counted noun when context makes it sufficient. There are many classifiers, which is daunting, and it is better to double the noun or the more common ones such as ທີ່ or ໂຕ. For single items, the classifier comes before the number; for more, the classifier comes after it.

The classifiers can sometimes be used in place of the nouns they group in context.

Possession
To indicate that object X belongs to object Y, Lao uses the construction X ຂອງ Y. ຂອງ can also be omitted without changing the meaning.

References

 Enfield, N. J. (2007). A grammar of Lao. Berlin, Germany: Mouton de Gruyter.
 Cummings, J. (2002). Lao phrasebook. Footscray, Australia: Lonely Planet Publishers.
 (in Thai) ภาษาและวรรณกรรมท้องถิ่นล้านนา : ฉบับสำนวนภาษากำเมือง [Northern Thai dialect and folk literature of Lanna]. Bangkok: Faculty of Humanities, MCU. 2009. . http://catalogue.nla.gov.au/Record/4697444.
 Mollerup, A. (2001). Thai- isan- lao phrasebook. Bangkok, Thailand: White Lotus.
 SEAlang Library Lao Lexicography. (2010, 13 February).

Lao language
Kra–Dai grammars